Naza is Maria Nazareth Maia Rufino McFarren (born 19 April 1955) is a Brazilian painter, best known for her abstract paintings of officials, celebrities, and endangered species.

Biography
Naza was born and attended elementary school in Santa Cruz do Piauí, Piauí and high school in Fortaleza. She started university in Teresina and in 1976, moved to Brasilia, where she began painting professionally. The same year she moved to Recife, where she lived for five years. It was here that Naza began developing her style, and made her first solo exhibition. Also in Recife, she had her daughter, Guiomar Rufino Lins e Silva in 1979.

In 1982, Naza started working for the Bank of Brazil and took a job in the city of Picos.  While living there, Naza traveled to make presentations and painting portraits in Fortaleza, Brazil, Recife, São Paulo and Rio de Janeiro. In Picos, she met and married Stuart McFarren, an American, and moved to the United States. First they went to Saint Thomas, and then to Dalton, Ohio. From there, she went to live for three years at Fort Kobbe, a U.S. military base in Panama. In Panama she was hired to paint portraits of high society in the country. Among her clients were General Noriega and his family.

It was in Panama at Gorgas Hospital, that her son, Daniel McFarren, was born, in 1987. Naza moved to Arlington, Virginia, in 1988. The current phase of the artist is the result of research while living in Arlington. The painting "Losing the Fear of Red", was a cornerstone and a major shift in her artistic direction.

In 1990, she moved to Barbados, where she lived a few months. Already separated, she moved with her two children to Fayetteville, North Carolina. There, she spent three years working as an artist, as a teacher of Portuguese to the U.S. Army, and art teacher for Fayetteville Technical Community College.

In 1993, she moved to the city of Boca Raton, Florida, where she opened a studio (Naza Art Studio) at Palmetto Park Road. She became intensely involved with the local community. She was an active member of several local organizations, including, Boca Raton Chamber of Commerce, Women in Visual Arts, Boca Raton Professional Artists Guild, American Pen Women, Soroptimists International.

In 1998, the journalist Suzane Jales wrote and published the book O Figurativo Abstrato de Naza (Abstracted Realism by Naza).
Naza moved to Deerfield Beach in 2003, and in 2005, began to create clothes and other products inspired by her paintings. 
Her art was at the mansion of Donald Trump in Palm Beach, Florida, attended by several celebrities, including Debbie Gibson, David Carradine and Dan Haggerty.
Between December 2007 and May 2019, the Artist lived most of the year in Brazil, where her wearable art pieces were being manufactured. From 2013 to 2015 Kjetil Breien Furuseth owned a Naza Art & Fashion shop, in Porto de Galinhas, Ipojuca, PE, Brazil.

Currently Naza resides in Fort Lauderdale area, FL.

In 2019 Naza started using the computer to create most of her artworks, migrating from oil on canvas to digital art.

References

External links 
Artist's website

1955 births
Living people
20th-century Brazilian women artists
21st-century Brazilian women artists
21st-century Brazilian artists
Abstract painters
Brazilian painters
Brazilian women painters
Brazilian emigrants to the United States
People from Piauí
Pseudonymous artists